The Alliance for Biosecurity is a consortium of companies that develop products to respond to national security threats, including bioterrorism pathogens and emerging infectious diseases. It is headquartered in Washington DC.

Background 
The United States faces risks to national security posed by the danger of bioterrorism or a destabilizing infectious disease pandemic. The vulnerability is considered severe because many of the vaccines and medicines that would be needed to protect people do not currently exist. The Alliance for Biosecurity is a group of pharmaceutical and biotechnology companies that work to create preventive measures and treatments for severe infectious diseases.

Within the U.S. federal government, the Biomedical Advanced Research and Development Authority (BARDA) and the Project BioShield Special Reserve Fund (SRF) provide funding to research, develop, and procure a medicines to control epidemics.

History 
The Alliance for Biosecurity was formed in 2005. Its purpose was to build a partnership between government and private sector biotechnology and pharmaceutical companies working in the biodefense space. The Center for Biosecurity, a nonprofit multidisciplinary organization of physicians public health professionals and scientists, was an organizer of the alliance and participates in it. Together, the two groups have provided congressional testimony and authored letters to Congress.

In April 2018, the alliance conducted a national poll about biosecurity. Seventy-three percent of the 1,612 Americans polled said they would support a congressional decision to increase funding to address biosecurity needs and capabilities. The poll was conducted, in part, to measure support for biosecurity funding because reauthorization of the Pandemic and All-Hazards Preparedness Act (PAHPA) is due by September 30, 2018. PAHPA is a law that improved the federal government's medical and public health preparedness for national security threats. Examples of threats include the spread of infectious diseases or chemical, biological, radiological or nuclear (CBRN) attacks.

In 2018, Congress passed the annual Labor, Health and Human Services, and Education appropriations bill before the end of the fiscal year for the first time in over 20 years. Congress also passed a Department of Defense appropriations bill before the end of the fiscal year for the first time in 10 years. The alliance supported passage of both bills. Key funding in the bills included:

 Project BioShield Special Reserve Fund (SRF): The fund received a $25 million increase. The SRF was first funded in 2004 and receives an annualized funding level of around $510 million since 2004. The current funding level is $735 million. The program creates public-private partnerships to advance the development of over 50 million doses of drugs against anthrax, smallpox, botulinum toxin and radiological threats.
Project BioShield: This program creates incentives for companies to invest in R&D in products for biodefense, because no commercial markets for such projects exist.

Mission 
The Alliance for Biosecurity is a coalition of biopharmaceutical companies and laboratory/academic partners that promotes a strong public-private partnership to ensure medical countermeasures are available to protect public health and enhance national health security. The Alliance advocates for public policies and funding to support the rapid development, production, stockpiling, and distribution of critically needed medical countermeasures.

Legislative support 
The alliance has supported the following legislation:
 21st Century Cures Act - legislation passed in the U.S. Senate that promotes innovation and efficiency in the development of new medical countermeasures
 Medical Countermeasures Innovation Act of 2015 - legislation that would encourage the development of medical countermeasures, including drugs, devices and preventative treatments that could be used after a biological terrorist attack or global pandemic
Pandemic and All-Hazards Preparedness and Advancing Innovation Act of 2018 (H.R. 6378) - legislation that would reauthorize the Pandemic and All-Hazards Preparedness Act (PAHPA) before its expiration on September 30, 2018. The alliance sent a letter with the U.S. Chamber of Commerce to each member of the House of Representatives urging its passage.
 Strengthening Public Health Emergency Response Act - legislation that creates new research incentives, improves transparency, and creates "predictable and flexible contracting"

The alliance also gives out awards to Congress. For example, in October 2017 it awarded eight Members of Congress, such as Maryland Congressman Dutch Ruppersberger, with its "Congressional Biosecurity Champion Award," which honors elected officials who work to improve how the U.S. can prevent and fight biosecurity threats. In 2019, it gave this award to Rep. Jaime Herrera Beutler (R-WA).

Membership 
The Alliance for Biosecurity is made up of the following biotechnology companies and university research labs:
 Bavarian Nordic
 Baxter International
 BioCryst
 iBio / CC-Pharming (former)
 Chimerix
 Coherus
 CUBRC, Inc.
 Elusys Therapeutics, Inc.
 Emerald Bioscience (former)
 Emergent BioSolutions
 GSK
 Hawaii Biotech (former)
 Heat Biologics
 Johnson & Johnson/Janssen
 Lovelace Respiratory Research Institute (former)
 Meridian Medical Technologies/Pfizer
 Nanotherapeutics
 Neumedicines (former)
 Novartis Vaccines (former)
 Opiant
 Pfenex
 Roche
 Romark Laboratories, L.C. (former)
 Sanofi Pasteur (former)
 SCYNEXIS
 Seqirus (former)
 Siga Technologies, Inc.
 Soligenix, Inc.
 The Texas A&M University System
 Tonix Pharmaceuticals
 University of Texas Medical Branch
 Venatorx Pharmaceuticals

See also 

 9/11 Commission
 Biological hazard
 Biological warfare
 Bioterrorism
 Blue Ribbon Study Panel on Biodefense
 Congressional Biodefense Caucus
 Pandemic influenza
 Terrorism
 United States biological defense program

References

External links
 
 Alliance for Biosecurity - Lobbying Spending Database

Bioterrorism
Biotechnology organizations
Medical and health organizations based in Washington, D.C.